Matúš Matis (born May 12, 1993) is a Slovak professional ice hockey player. He is currently a free agent having last played for HK Poprad in the Slovak Extraliga.

Career
Matis previously played for HC Košice, MsHK Žilina and HKm Zvolen. He also played in the Ligue Magnus for Aigles de Nice, having signed for the team on June 5, 2018. Matis signed for Lions de Lyons on May 16, 2019 but would be released without ever playing for the team. He instead signed for HK Poprad on September 24, 2019.

Matis also played for the Chicoutimi Saguenéens of the Quebec Major Junior Hockey League during the 2010–11 season before turning professional.

Career statistics

Regular season and playoffs

International

References

External links

 

1993 births
Living people
Chicoutimi Saguenéens (QMJHL) players
HC Košice players
HK Poprad players
Les Aigles de Nice players
Slovak ice hockey forwards
Sportspeople from Košice
MsHK Žilina players
HKM Zvolen players
Slovak expatriate ice hockey players in Canada
Slovak expatriate ice hockey players in the Czech Republic
Slovak expatriate ice hockey players in the United States
Slovak expatriate ice hockey players in Sweden
Slovak expatriate sportspeople in France
Expatriate ice hockey players in France